The Democratic Populars (Popolari Democratici) was a tiny Christian-Democratic political party based in Campania, Italy. It was led by Pietro Squeglia, a former deputy for the Italian People's Party and The Daisy.

History 
It was founded in February 2008 by splinters from the Union of Democrats for Europe who wanted to continue the alliance with centre-left The Union coalition. The party was joined by Nicola Caputo, Vittorio Insigne and Giuseppe Maisto, all three regional councillors of Campania, and several provincial and municipal ministers.

In 2010 the party joined the Alliance for Italy, a new party founded by Francesco Rutelli.

References

2008 establishments in Italy
Christian democratic parties in Italy
Catholic political parties
Defunct Christian political parties
Political parties established in 2008
Political parties in Campania